
This is a list of programs currently, formerly, and soon to be broadcast by Noovo. This includes programming that aired under the network's former brands of TQS and V.

Programs

0-9
2 laits, un sucre - morning news and talk show hosted by Dominic Paquet, François Maranda and Valérie Simard
10-07: L'affaire Zeus - drama
450, Chemin du Golf - comedy

A
À table avec mon ex! - reality
Action Réaction - game show
Agent Carter - drama
Agents of S.H.I.E.L.D. - drama
The Amazing Race - reality
Ambulance animales - reality
L'Amour est dans le pré 
APB: Alerte d'urgence - drama
Après OD - reality aftershow
Arabesque - drama
L'Arbitre - court show
L'Attaque à 5 - sports news
Automania
Aventures en nord

B
Le Bachelor - reality
Bellevue - drama
Big Brother - reality
Bleu Nuit - late night softcore porn
Blindés
Bob Gratton : Ma Vie, My Life - comedy
Les Bolés
Bootcamp: Le parcours extrême
Box-office

C
Cardinal - drama
Ce soir on char
Ces chiens qui sauvent des vies
Chicago Justice - drama
Chicago Med - drama
Chicago Police - drama
Code 111
Colocs!
Comme chien et chat
CSI Miami: Les Experts - drama

D
Danser pour gagner
Défi 21 jours bootcamp
Destin amoureux
Dragon Ball Z
Dumont - news/talk show hosted by Mario Dumont
Dutrizac - news/talk show

E
Les Effaceurs
Ellen's Game of Games - game show
En prison
Entre deux draps - comedy

F
La Ferme chez soi
La Fin du monde est à 7 heures - news satire
Flashpoint - police drama
La Fouille

G
Gâteaux en folie
G.O.A.T.
Gotham
Le Grand Journal - news
Grand Rire Bleue
La Guerre des clans - local adaptation of Family Feud

H
Haute sécurité
Huissiers

I
Imposteurs

J
Je suis chef - cooking competition
Le Journal du soir - news

K
Les Karineries
Le Killing - comedy

L
Lance et compte - drama
Loft Story - reality
Lucifer - drama

M
Maître du chantier
Max et Livia
Mets-y le Paquet
Moment décisif
Moment détente
Mon ex à moi

N
NCIS: Los Angeles - drama
Ne jamais faire à la maison
NVL - news

O
Occupation Double - reality
L'Open Mic de...

P
Paquet de troubles
Pas le choix de rénover 
Pas si bête que ça
Phil s'invite
Pompiers: La relève
La Porte des étoiles - science fiction
Pour toujours, plus un jour - drama
Pratique Privée - drama
Le Prochain stand-up - reality competition

Q
Qu'est-ce qui mijote
Qui sait chanter? — local adaptation of I Can See Your Voice

R
Les Recrues
Rire et délire - comedy
Rock et Belles Oreilles - sketch comedy
RPM
RPM+

S
SEAL Team : Cœur et courage
La Semaine des 4 Julie - talk show
Les Simpson - animated
S.O.S. Beauté
South Park - animated
Sports 30
Supère Mario Monde
Supergirl
Sur la route avec Cath Peach

T
Taxi payant
TKO: Total Knock Out
Tommy - drama
Tony Speed
Top Dogs: Homicides
Tout s'embellit avec Julie - home design
Transplanté - drama
Tu m'aimes, tu mens!

U
Un souper presque parfait - reality

V
Vendeurs de rêve - reality
Virage - dramatic anthology

W
Wipeout Québec - game show

X
The X-Files - science fiction

Y
Y'a plein d'soleil

References

Noovo